John Mahood (12 March 1898 – 25 February 1984) was an Irish footballer who played for a number of Irish clubs. He featured nine times for the Ireland national football team between 1926 and 1933, scoring two goals.

Career statistics

International

International goals
Scores and results list Ireland's goal tally first.

References

1898 births
1984 deaths
People from Banbridge
Pre-1950 IFA international footballers
Association football forwards
Glentoran F.C. players
Bangor F.C. players
Belfast Celtic F.C. players
Ballymena United F.C. players
Association footballers from Northern Ireland